"Night Train" is a song written by Neil Thrasher and Michael Dulaney and recorded by American country music artist Jason Aldean. It was released in June 2013 as the fourth single and title track from his 2012 album of the same name.

Content
"Night Train" is a mid-tempo rock ballad about two lovers finding the perfect spot for romance at night while waiting for a train to pass by.

Critical reception
Billy Dukes of Taste of Country gave "Night Train" three out of five stars. He stated, "the lyrics aren’t as vivid as some of Aldean’s better ballads, but his performance feels inspired by some real place and love from his past." He also said, "Aldean shows real vocal power and that this song is a nice reminder of what he’s capable of."

Live performances
Jason Aldean debuted the new single on June 5, 2013 at the CMT Music Awards.

Music video
The music video was directed by Wes Edwards and premiered on August 6, 2013.

Commercial performance
The song entered the Billboard Hot 100 at No. 92, and the Hot Country Songs chart at No. 26 for the week that the album Night Train was released. It dropped from the chart until the song was released to radio as a single, and re-entered the Billboard Hot 100 at No. 90 for the charted dated July 27, 2013. It peaked at No. 26 on the Billboard Hot 100 for the charted dated October 12, 2013. The song has reached its million sales mark in the US by April 2014.

The song debuted at No. 85 on the Canadian Hot 100 chart for the week the album was released. It peaked at No. 39.

Charts and certifications

Weekly charts

Year-end charts

Certifications

References

2013 singles
Jason Aldean songs
BBR Music Group singles
Song recordings produced by Michael Knox (record producer)
Songs written by Neil Thrasher
Songs written by Michael Dulaney
2012 songs
Music videos directed by Wes Edwards